Huai Sai is a tambon (subdistrict) of San Kamphaeng District, in Chiang Mai Province, Thailand. In 2020 it had a total population of 5,964 people.

Administration

Central administration
The tambon is subdivided into 8 administrative villages (muban).

Local administration
The whole area of the subdistrict is covered by the subdistrict municipality (Thesaban Tambon) Huai Sai (เทศบาลตำบลห้วยทราย).

References

External links
Thaitambon.com on Huai Sai

Tambon of Chiang Mai province
Populated places in Chiang Mai province